(born October 14, 1967) is a retired Japanese male hurdler. He competed for Japan at the 1992 Summer Olympics, where he was eliminated in the first heat of the quarterfinals.

International competitions

References

1967 births
Living people
Japanese male hurdlers
Olympic male hurdlers
Olympic athletes of Japan
Athletes (track and field) at the 1992 Summer Olympics
Asian Games silver medalists for Japan
Asian Games medalists in athletics (track and field)
Athletes (track and field) at the 1990 Asian Games
Medalists at the 1990 Asian Games
20th-century Japanese people
21st-century Japanese people